Carlos Gregorio Rivero González (born 27 November 1992) is a Venezuelan international footballer who plays for Caracas FC as a centre back.

Career
Born in Valencia, Rivero has played club football for Carabobo and Deportivo Anzoátegui.

He made his international debut for Venezuela in 2011.

References

External links

1992 births
Living people
Venezuelan footballers
Venezuela international footballers
Venezuela under-20 international footballers
Carabobo F.C. players
Deportivo Anzoátegui players
Deportivo Táchira F.C. players
A.C.C.D. Mineros de Guayana players
Asociación Civil Deportivo Lara players
Caracas FC players
Venezuelan Primera División players
Association football defenders
21st-century Venezuelan people